Zacladus is a genus of true weevils (beetles of the family Curculionidae) alternatively placed in the subfamily Ceutorhynchinae or in the tribe Ceutorhynchini in the subfamily Baridinae.

References 

Ceutorhynchini
Baridinae genera